Lake Poinsett is one of the largest lakes in the state of South Dakota.

The lake is located northeast of the town of Arlington, South Dakota.  It has the name of the U. S. Secretary of War, Joel Poinsett.  In 1838, the area was first visited by the expedition of Joseph Nicollet and John Fremont, who camped on the lake's north shore. Poinsett was instrumental in promoting the expedition.

Shoreside housing developments along the lake comprise the census-designated place of Lake Poinsett.

See also
List of lakes in South Dakota
List of lakes of the United States

References

External links
Lake Poinsett Recreational Area
Lake Poinsett Bar & Restaurant
Arlington Beach Resort
Lake Poinsett Cabin Rentals

Lakes of South Dakota
Lakes of Brookings County, South Dakota
Lakes of Hamlin County, South Dakota